Frenaros is a village in the Famagusta District of Cyprus. In 2011, it had a population of 4,298.

History 
Frenaros was named after Lusignan monks called Fremenors, who lived in the nearby Panagia of Hortakion monastery. It has two churches that date back to the 12th century. In 1925, Swedish archeologist Einar Gjerstad uncovered evidence that the village dates back to the Neolithic period. The earliest known mention of Frenaros was in the 15th century, where it was referred to as "Apano Frenaro" (Απάνω Φρέναρο; "Up Frenaro") and "Kato Frenaro" (Κάτω Φρέναρο; "Down Frenaro"), suggesting that it once used to be divided into two separate parts.

Notable people
 Eleftheria Eleftheriou (born 1989), singer and actress

References

External links
 British pathe newsreel from 1955, featuring Frenaros
 Official community website

Communities in Famagusta District